Lancaster Township is a township in Atchison County, Kansas, United States. As of the 2010 census, its population was 818.

Geography
According to the USGS, it contains two cemeteries: Alderson and Old Huron.

References
 USGS Geographic Names Information System (GNIS)

External links
 City-Data.com

Townships in Atchison County, Kansas
Townships in Kansas